Solo Day is the fifth mini-album released by B1A4 under WM Entertainment. The album was released on July 14, 2014 by WM Entertainment and their distributing label Pony Canyon Korea. The title song of the album, "Solo Day, was produced by leader Jinyoung along with 5 other tracks in the album. CNU also produced 1 song in the album.

Background
There are 5 pictures: Jinyoung is "Couch Potato", Sandeul is "Pizza Delivery" Guy, CNU is "Obsession Guy", Baro is a "Space Geek" and Gongchan is a "Flower Vagabond". There is a 22-second video with a game trailer. There are also more videos on YouTube in the official channel of B1A4, B1A4 OFFICIAL +: #1 DRIVE, #2 BEACH, #3 RUN AWAY, #4 UFO?, #5 ENCOUNTER, and #6 FIVE BOYS.

Music video
In the music video "Drive" shows a road. "Beach" has an upward view of B1A4 walking on the beach. "Run Away" has  B1A4 running on the beach. #4 UFO? has Baro trying to show Sandeul, Gongchan, Jinyoung, and CNU his headphones that make him look like an alien, the rest of  B1A4 is focused on a UFO. #5 ENCOUNTER shows the UFO  B1A4 was looking at in #4 UFO?.#6 FIVE BOYS shows the five from  B1A4 writing "B1A4" on the beach. All these teaser videos show little parts of the whole music video of Solo Day which was released on July 13, 2014. The official music video of Solo Day was released on July 14, 2014.

Track listing

Charts

See also
 List of Gaon Album Chart number ones of 2014

References

2014 EPs
B1A4 EPs